Lepocinclis is a genus of algae belonging to the family Phacaceae.

The genus has cosmopolitan distribution.

Species

Species:

Lepocinclis acicularis
Lepocinclis acus 
Lepocinclis acuta

References

Euglenozoa
Euglenozoa genera